On August 23, 1987, the bodies of 16-year-old Don Henry and 17-year-old Kevin Ives were hit by a freight train in Alexander, Arkansas, United States, as they were laying on the tracks. The locomotive engineer engaged the brakes while blowing the horn, but the train could not stop in time and rolled over the bodies.  A second autopsy revealed that Don Henry had been stabbed in the back and Kevin Ives' skull had been crushed prior to being run over.

The deaths were initially ruled an accident, the result of the boys in a deep sleep on the tracks while incapacitated due to high amounts of THC allegedly present in their blood. The parents of the boys insisted on a second autopsy, and after exhumation it was ruled that homicide was likely. Later, another pathologist ruled that Don Henry's shirt showed evidence of a stab wound.

Background

About 4:00 a.m. on August 23, 1987, the crew on board a 75-car, 6,000-ton Union Pacific freight train, more than a mile long and traveling at a rate more than 50 miles per hour, en route to Little Rock, Arkansas, spotted two boys lying motionless across the tracks, about 300 feet ahead.  Members of the locomotive crew also stated that the bodies were partly covered by a green tarpaulin, though police disputed the existence of any such tarp and none was ever recovered from the scene. Nearby were a .22 caliber rifle and a flashlight. The boys did not move, despite the sound and vibration of the approaching train, its emergency brakes, and its air horn. More than 1,000 feet of the decelerating train crossed the point where the bodies lay before it came to a stop.

The train's crew reported the incident to railroad and law enforcement authorities. By 4:40 a.m., police arrived on the scene. Police never found a tarp.

The boys had reportedly left home about midnight to go hunting. The gun and flashlight near the bodies suggested they were using a hunting technique known as spotlighting, which involves using a bright light to scan for animals whose eyes brightly reflect the light after dark.

Autopsies
The state medical examiner, Dr. Fahmy Malak, ruled the deaths an accident as a result of marijuana intoxication, saying the boys had smoked the equivalent of 20 marijuana cigarettes and fell asleep on the tracks.  The parents did not accept this finding and conducted their own investigation. 

In March 1988, Dr. James Garriot of San Antonio offered a second opinion and was skeptical of the findings about marijuana. A second autopsy by Georgia medical examiner Dr. Joseph Burton found the equivalent of one or two marijuana cigarettes, not 20. A grand jury ruled the deaths a "probable homicide." When it was found that Don Henry's shirt contained evidence of a stab wound to the back, and Kevin Ives' skull may have been crushed by his own rifle, the ruling was changed to "definite homicide." Don Henry's father also noted that he did not believe his son would have risked his gun getting scratched by laying it on gravel.

Suspects and theories
One week before the boys died, a man wearing military fatigues was spotted not far from the train tracks. When police officer Danny Allen attempted to stop him, the man opened fire and managed to disappear into the night. On the same night the boys died, a similar-looking man dressed in military fatigues was spotted nearby.

The usual theory given about the boys' deaths, believed by Linda Ives, involves drug trafficking. The theory is that the boys came upon a drug drop from an airplane similar to Barry Seal's operations near Mena and were murdered.

Dan Harmon, a prosecutor of the case, who was later arrested for dealing drugs, is one person implicated in the murder. Keith McCaskle, also implicated in the murder, was stabbed to death by an unknown attacker on November 10, 1988.

The case was profiled on the television program Unsolved Mysteries.

See also 

 List of unsolved murders (1980–1999)

Further reading
Leveritt, Mara. The Boys on the Tracks: Death, Denial, and a Mother's Crusade to Bring Her Son's Killers to Justice. New York: St. Martin’s Press, 1999. .

References

External links

Encyclopedia of Arkansas
ID Files Website run by Kevin Ives mother

1987 deaths
1987 in Arkansas
1987 in rail transport
1987 murders in the United States
August 1987 events in the United States
August 1987 crimes
Deaths by person in Arkansas
Male murder victims
Murdered American children
People from Bryant, Arkansas
Unsolved murders in the United States
Deaths by stabbing in the United States
Incidents of violence against boys
People murdered in Arkansas
History of Pulaski County, Arkansas